The Vilan is a mountain in the Rätikon range of the Alps, located north of Malans in the canton of Graubünden. It lies south of the Falknis, between the main Rhine valley and the Taschinas valley.

References

External links

 Vilan on Hikr

Mountains of the Alps
Mountains of Graubünden
Mountains of Switzerland
Seewis im Prättigau
Malans, Switzerland